The 1974–75 Rugby Football League season was the 80th season of competition between the clubs of England's Northern Rugby Football League. The season's First Division Championship featured 16 clubs and was won by St. Helens. The Challenge Cup was won by Widnes.

Rule change
 Drop goals became worth one point. Drops had previously been worth two points.

Season summary
St. Helens won their seventh Championship. York, Bramley, Rochdale Hornets and Halifax were demoted to the Second Division.

The Challenge Cup Winners were Widnes who beat Warrington 14–7 in the final.

Players No.6 Trophy Winners were Bradford Northern who beat Widnes 3–2 in the final.

Rugby League Premiership Trophy Winners were Leeds who beat St. Helens 26–11 in the final.

BBC2 Floodlit Trophy Winners were Salford who beat Warrington 10–5 in a replay after a 0–0 draw in the final.

2nd Division Champions were Huddersfield, and they, Hull Kingston Rovers, Oldham and Swinton were promoted to the First Division.

Widnes beat Salford 6–2 to win the Lancashire County Cup, and Hull Kingston Rovers beat Wakefield Trinity 16–13 to win the Yorkshire County Cup.

League Tables

First Division Championship

Second Division Championship

Challenge Cup

Widnes beat Warrington 14–7 in the final played at Wembley in front of a crowd of 85,998.

This was Widnes’ fourth Cup Final win in sixth Final appearances.

Widnes 14
Ray Dutton (5 goals, 1 drop goal)
Alan Prescott
Derek 'Mick' George
Mal Aspey
Chris Anderson
Eric Hughes
Reg Bowden
Jim Mills (1 try)
Keith Elwell
Barry Sheridan
John Foran
Mick Adams
Doug Laughton

Warrington 7
Derek Whitehead (2 goals)
Mike Philbin
Derek Noonan
Frank Reynolds
John Bevan (1 try)
Alan Whittle
Parry Gordon
David Chisnall ©
Kevin Ashcroft
Bobby Wanbon
Tommy Conroy
Thomas Martyn
Barry Philbin
Wilf Briggs for No. 4 Frank Reynolds
Mike Nicholas for No. 12 Thomas Martyn

Referee: P. Geraghty (York)

Lance Todd Trophy Winner: Ray Dutton (Widnes)-

League Cup

Premiership

Sources
 1974-75 Rugby Football League season at wigan.rlfans.com
 The Challenge Cup at The Rugby Football League website

References

1974 in English rugby league
1975 in English rugby league
Northern Rugby Football League seasons